August Liivak (1896 – 26 May 1939 Tartu) was an Estonian politician. He was a member of IV Riigikogu. He was a member of the Riigikogu since 15 March 1930. He replaced Hugo Ratassepp.

References

1896 births
1939 deaths
Members of the Riigikogu, 1929–1932
Politicians from Tartu